Archery at the 2018 Asian Games was held between 21 and 28 August 2018 at the Gelora Bung Karno Archery Field in Jakarta, Indonesia, and consisted of eight events.

Schedule

Medalists

Recurve

Compound

Medal table

Participating nations
A total of 259 athletes from 29 nations competed in archery at the 2018 Asian Games:

References

External links 
Archery at the 2018 Asian Games
Official Result Book – Archery

 
2018
2018 Asian Games events
2018 in archery
International archery competitions hosted by Indonesia